Asante may refer to:

 Anglican Diocese of Asante Mampong, Ghana
 Asante Kotoko, an Ashanti professional football club
 Asante people
 Ashanti (disambiguation)
 R. v. Asante-Mensah, a leading Supreme Court of Canada decision 

Language and nationality disambiguation pages